Have a Nice Life is the ninth studio album by American rapper Murs. The album was released on May 18, 2015, by Strange Music.

Critical reception

Upon its release, Have a Nice Life received generally positive reviews from music critics. At Metacritic, which assigns a normalized rating out of 100 to reviews from mainstream critics, the album received an average score of 75 based on 5 reviews, which indicates "generally favorable reviews". Andrew Gretchko of HipHopDX said, "And while some may be upset that Murs isn’t the unruly rapper he once was, he’s managed to craft a project that remains true while growing up enough to talk about life in a radiant, maturity tinged glow." Marcus J. Moore of Pitchfork Media said, "As a whole, Have a Nice Life stands as a decent collection of songs that, while palatable, casually floats by in a sea of average beats by Jesse Shatkin, who produced much of the album." Kellan Miller of XXL stated, "The overt push for mainstream appeal on Murs For President too often posited the California native outside his comfort zone, sometimes yielding mediocre results. But while the instrumentals have a poppy edge, on Have A Nice Life Murs utilizes the full arsenal of his skills to craft an album with the same passion as an artist introducing himself to the world for the first time."

Track listing

Charts

References

2015 albums
Murs (rapper) albums
Strange Music albums